John Davies (born 20 November 1952) is a Welsh former athlete.

Born in the Welsh village of Llwynypia, Davies was a member of the Thames Valley Harriers and became British national champion for the 3000 metres steeplechase in 1974. He was a Welsh record holder in that event.

Davies claimed a surprise silver medal for Wales in the 3000 metres steeplechase at the 1974 British Commonwealth Games in Christchurch, where he had not been considered a serious contender for a podium spot. Due to a last lap collision he had with bronze medalist Evans Mogaka, Davies was disqualified after the race but on appeal was reinstated his silver medal after judges viewed the tape and ruled the contact was accidental.

References

External links
John Davies at World Athletics

1952 births
Living people
Welsh male middle-distance runners
Welsh male steeplechase runners
People from Llwynypia
Sportspeople from Rhondda Cynon Taf
Athletes (track and field) at the 1974 British Commonwealth Games
Medallists at the 1974 British Commonwealth Games
Commonwealth Games silver medallists for Wales
Commonwealth Games medallists in athletics
Athletes (track and field) at the 1978 Commonwealth Games
Competitors at the 1975 Summer Universiade